Favazza is an Italian surname. Notable people with the surname include:

 Armando Favazza (born 1941), American author and psychiatrist
 Joseph A. Favazza, American religious scholar and academic administrator
 Mariano Favazza (born 1952), American state court judge
 Valentina Favazza (born 1987), Italian voice actress

Italian-language surnames